Yarley Meadows is a  biological Site of Special Scientific Interest in Gloucestershire, England, notified in 1987.

Location and habitat

The site, which consists of three fields, is in the south of Gloucestershire and is adjacent to Lower Woods which is also an SSSI. The meadows are unimproved neutral grassland.  They are traditionally managed and support a diversity of species.  Such grassland is now rare in the United Kingdom.

The meadows are on Jurassic and Cretaceous clays (Denchworth Series).  They are waterlogged in the winter months and poorly drained. Mature hedges surround and breakup the meadows and there are ponds in two fields.

Flora
The grass species include crested dog's-tail, sweet vernal-grass, Yorkshire fog, red fescue and quaking-grass. Sedge and rush are in abundance in the wetter parts of the fields and include glaucous sedge, hairy sedge, soft rush and hard rush.

Herbs include dyer's greenweed, saw-wort, adder's-tongue, common knapweed, betony and pepper saxifrage. Yellow-rattle, common spotted-orchid, sneezewort, cowslip and hoary plantain are also recorded.

Invertebrates
The meadows support large numbers of butterflies such as meadow brown and gatekeeper.

References

SSSI Source
 Natural England SSSI information on the citation
 Natural England SSSI information on the Yarley Meadows unit

External links
 Natural England (SSSI information)

Meadows in Gloucestershire
Sites of Special Scientific Interest in Gloucestershire
Sites of Special Scientific Interest notified in 1987